Dowlatabad-e Kaffeh (also Romanized as Dowlatābād-e Kaffeh; also known as Dowlatābād) is a village in Sharifabad Rural District, in the Central District of Sirjan County, Kerman Province, Iran. At the 2006 census, its population was 136, in 40 families.

References 

Populated places in Sirjan County